Ivan Mekikov (born 29 May 1982) is a Bulgarian footballer, who plays as a midfielder for Vidima-Rakovski. He is a former member of the Bulgaria U21 team.

References

External links 
 

1982 births
Living people
Bulgarian footballers
First Professional Football League (Bulgaria) players
FC Maritsa Plovdiv players
PFC CSKA Sofia players
PFC Cherno More Varna players
PFC Vidima-Rakovski Sevlievo players
FC Spartak Plovdiv players
Association football midfielders